Wales was a constituency of the European Parliament. It elected 4 MEPs using the D'Hondt method of party-list proportional representation, until the UK exit from the European Union on 31 January 2020.

Boundaries 
The constituency corresponded to the boundaries of Wales, one of the four countries of the United Kingdom.

History 
It was formed as a result of the European Parliamentary Elections Act 1999, replacing a number of single-member constituencies. These were Mid and West Wales, North Wales, South Wales Central, South Wales East, and South Wales West.

Returned members

Election results 
Elected candidates are shown in bold. Brackets indicate the number of votes per seat won.

Elections in the 2010s

2019

2019 opinion polls

2014

2014 opinion polls

Elections in the 2000s

Elections in the 1990s

References

Politics of Wales
European Parliament constituencies in Wales
1999 establishments in Wales
Constituencies established in 1999
Constituencies disestablished in 2020
2020 disestablishments in Wales